Aposteira is a monotypic moth genus in the family Geometridae. Its only species, Aposteira saurides, is found in Madagascar. Both the genus and species were first described by Prout in 1935.

References

Larentiinae
Geometridae genera
Monotypic moth genera